The Resch Expo is a multi-purpose exhibition center in the village of Ashwaubenon, Wisconsin in the United States; directly across the street from Lambeau Field. It was built to replace Shopko Hall and the Brown County Veterans Memorial Arena, both of which were nearly 60 years of age and becoming increasingly expensive to operate. They were both razed in May 2019. The project was completed in January 2021; the cost of the project is estimated to be $93 million.

On February 13, 2020, Brown County announced that the center would be named Resch Expo following a 20-year, $10 million agreement with KI Industries CEO Dick Resch, who also owns the naming rights to the nearby Resch Center.

Features
The center features three convention halls totaling  of exhibit space, nearly three times more than Shopko Hall. The center also has six meeting rooms available.

Resch Expo will take the events formerly at Shopko Hall, including the Titletown Train Show, Everybody's Rummage Sale, Sweet Street (a yearly child-friendly Halloween celebration with trick-or-treating), the WBAY-TV Pet Expo, and the WBAY RV & Camping Show.

References 

Tourist attractions in Brown County, Wisconsin
Buildings and structures in Brown County, Wisconsin
Convention centers in Wisconsin